Tell Township is a defunct township in Emmons County, North Dakota, United States. Its population as of the 2000 Census was 39. The township was dissolved on March 13, 2007, and added to the census-designated North Emmons Unorganized Territory.

References

External links
U.S. Census map of Tell Township as of the 2000 Census

Former townships in Emmons County, North Dakota
Defunct townships in North Dakota